King Arthur and the Knights of Justice is an animated series produced by Golden Films, C&D (Créativité et Développement) and Bohbot Entertainment. The series was created by Jean Chalopin along with Diane Eskenazi (Golden Films) and Avi Arad (Toy Biz chairman, CEO and the founder of Marvel Studios) who were also executive producers of the series, which lasted for two seasons of 13 episodes each. Its first episode aired on September 13, 1992, and the last episode was on December 12, 1993. It aired as part of Bohbot's Amazin' Adventures programming block.

Plot
The show's premise had King Arthur and the Knights of the Round Table trapped in the Cave of Glass by Arthur's sister, the evil enchantress Queen Morgana. Unable to free King Arthur and the Knights himself, the wizard Merlin searches the timeline for replacement Knights. He finds the quarterback of the New York Knights football team Arthur King and transports him and his teammates to Camelot after one of their football games. He appoints Arthur King as their leader with his teammates as the new Knights of the Round Table and assigns them the task of freeing the true King and Knights. To do so, they must find the Twelve Keys of Truth, one for each knight that only the knight in question can initially touch. Once all the keys are found, the real knights will be free and the team will return home. In the meantime, they pledge "fairness to all, to protect the weak and vanquish the evil". The Knights are armed with special armor and are able to summon their respective creatures at any time when in battle armor. These animals, such as King Arthur's wyvern, are emblazoned on their shields.

The series had a progressive story with both sides advanced towards their goals. Continuity was also established in the episodes which would be brought up in later episodes, along with some repeat minor characters, character relationships, and previously overcome weaknesses of the Knights. Despite the continual movement towards a resolution, the series is incomplete and ended abruptly during the second season.

Characters

The Knights of the Round Table
 King Arthur (Arthur King) (voiced by Andrew Kavadas) – The quarterback of his football team, The Knights, in his own time, Arthur uses his natural leadership skill in battle against Morgana's forces. While seeking Merlin's counsel at times, Arthur usually comes up with clever strategies and battle plans when needed. His shield houses the Dragon of Justice (also called the Dragon of the Shield), a wyvern which can be unleashed to do his bidding when he needs it. The wyvern was the family crest of the original Arthur of legend, Arthur Pendragon. He stores the great sword Excalibur in his chestplate, rather than a sheath. His horse's name is mentioned once as being Valor.
 Sir Lancelot (Lance) (voiced by Scott McNeil) – Lance is the second-in-command of the knights and Arthur's best friend. Fearless and brave, Lance is usually the most serious of the knights. His emblem is a lion and his primary weapon is a lance.
 Sir Tone (voiced by Scott McNeil in an Italian accent) – Tone is the team's inventor and blacksmith due to experiences in metal shop. He invents many machines based on ones he has seen in his own time. Tone's real name is Anthony. His chestplate houses a hammer and chisel with which he can build almost anything.
 Sir Trunk (voiced by Scott McNeil) – The knights' strongman. His primary weapon is a double-headed battle axe and his shield contains a giant ram strong enough to break down walls and carry several people on its back with ease.
 Sir Wally (voiced by Lee Jeffrey) – A guard for The Knights football team, as a true knight his job is now to protect Arthur during attacks. Good-natured, but takes it hard when he makes mistakes. Sir Brick is his best friend. His shield emblem is a falcon.
 Sir Brick (voiced by Garry Chalk) – Like Wally, Brick is usually used as Arthur's bodyguard. He has unwavering loyalty to his friends, including his best friend Wally. He is able to call an apparently unlimited supply of bricks out of his chest plate and create massive walls from them at will.
 Sir Phil (voiced by Garry Chalk) – One of the stronger knights of the twelve. Is very adamant about returning "to the land of cheeseburgers and fries". His chestplate houses a club and his shield contains a black panther.
 Sir Darren (voiced by Michael Donovan) – The only one of the knights with a crossbow, Darren is the team's pretty boy. Now he has found a steady girlfriend in Lady Elaine. He is usually cool and confident on and off the battlefield, perhaps too much so. His shield houses a giant eagle capable of lifting multiple men in each talon.
 Sir Gallop (voiced by Mark Hildreth) – The ladies' man, Gallop constantly thinks of women, though is also very respectful towards them. His chestplate houses a pike with a spiked ball on the end and his shield houses a two-headed hound. In season 2, he dates the peasant girl called Katherine.
 Sir Breeze (voiced by Lee Jeffrey) – The team's wide receiver who is a big trash talker in the group. He also uses a lot of slang of his time, and is both afraid of heights and small spaces. His primary weapon is a pike which can shoot bolts from the tip; and his shield emblem is the sphinx. He is a bit of an egotist but knows where his priorities lie.
 Sir Lug (voiced by Michael Donovan) – Though originally the team's equipment manager, in medieval times, Lug is in charge of Camelot's squires. Lug has low self-esteem and is usually picked on by some of the other knights, but he possesses great courage and can even hold his own against Lord Viper in a fight. His shield emblem resembles a kraken and his chest armor launches a football projectile at enemies.
 Sir Zeke (voiced by Mark Hildreth) – The only Asian player on the team; he is also the genius of the group using tech lingo when speaking.

Camelot characters
 Merlin (voiced by Jim Byrnes) – The great wizard who served King Arthur. He was responsible for bringing Arthur King and his teammates into the past to fight against Morgana after the real King Arthur and his knights were imprisoned. Merlin is a great asset to the knights and uses his various spells, potions, and advice to assist them when needed. He is also the only person from his time period to know Arthur and the others' true identities.
 Queen Guinevere (voiced by Kathleen Barr) – Camelot's queen and the real King Arthur's wife. Guinevere was captured by Morgana at the show's beginning, but she was rescued by Arthur King (posing as her husband), Lance, and Trunk. She often wonders about the change in Arthur's demeanor and manner of acting, unaware of the whole truth.
 Lady Elaine (voiced by Venus Terzo) – Guinevere's attendant and Darren's girlfriend.
 Lady Mary – Guinevere's second attendant and aunt to Squire Everett. In "To Save a Squire", she and Sir Tone at first resent each other until the end of the episode where they show affection for each other.
 Katherine – A peasant girl that becomes Sir Gallop's girlfriend starting season 2.
 Squire Tyronne (voiced by Michael Donovan) – A squire who looks up to Sir Lug and has a strong desire to be a knight.
 Squire Everett (voiced by Mark Hildreth) – Like Tyrone, Everett is very passionate about being a knight. Nephew of Lady Mary.
 Lady of the Table (voiced by Kathleen Barr)  – The protector of the knights, her spirit can be seen as the knights are being equipped with their armor and weapons. The knights cannot see her until the Season 2 episode "What the Key Unlocked" where she reveals herself to Lance.  She will usually tell Arthur and group to "speak the oath" prior to activating their transformation.

Morgana's forces
 Queen Morgana / Lady Morgana (voiced by Kathleen Barr) – The evil sorceress who serves as the primary antagonist of the series. She was responsible for sealing Arthur and his knights into the Cave of Glass. Morgana despises Merlin and has great magical prowess. While she does not know where they came from, she knows the new Arthur and his set of knights are frauds.
 Lord Viper (voiced by Garry Chalk) – The second-in-command and overall field commander of the Warlords. He seems to be the only human in Lady Morgana's army. Viper has a constant hatred for Arthur King and they have had several sword fights throughout the series. Viper's main weapon is a jagged-edge sword, but he also has a snake emblem on his armor which can attack Viper's opponent. He rides in a cart that doubles as a catapult.
 Warlords - The Warlords are Morgana's minions who were constructed out of stone. If the Warlords are broken or destroyed in battle, Morgana can reassemble them using her magic.
 Warlord Axe (voiced by Scott McNeil) – A warlord who is not too bright, Axe has a plethora of ax weapons and an ax cart. He has appeared in almost every episode and has defeated King Arthur on two separate occasions.
 Warlord Bash (voiced by Garry Chalk) – A primitive warlord who wields a bone club and skull-shaped shield. He likely represents the Saxon barbarians that raid most of Europe in legend.
 Warlord Blackwing (voiced by Scott McNeil) – The third-in-command and Viper's right-hand man, Blackwing possesses Pterodactyl-like wings and can fly, allowing him to attack his enemies with the mid-air dart attacks from his talons. He is also equipped with a pike. Warlord Blackwing is responsible for capturing Guinevere early in the series.
 Warlord Blinder – A warlord who is able to blind his opponents by striking together his two dirks. He can also throw them with perfect aim.
 Warlord Hammer (voiced by Michael Donovan) – A super strong behemoth with two hammers as weapons considered to be one of the strongest among them.
 Warlord Lucan – A savage wolf-like berserker warlord with sharp claws, missile attacks, and a wolf-head cart that breathes fire.
 Warlord Slasher – A warlord with many sharp weapons including spears, a serrated–spiked cape and a spear cart. Also, his armor could be configured into a pair of deadly gauntlets. Like Blackwing, he can fly, but does so rarely.
 Warlord Spike – A warlord with a voulge style weapon and a spear cart that can shoot projectiles. He also seems to be one of the smartest as he leads many missions and applies battle strategies.

Purple Horde
 Master Chang – The katana-wielding leader of the Purple Horde, an army of Asian warriors who menace the Knights in the second season. They have their mind set on conquest and are in a feeble alliance with the Warlords. Chang upholds a strict code of honor for the Purple Horde to abide by which allows a level of understanding between them and the Knights.
 Awan – A warrior who uses a nunchaku and carries a war horn.
 Hung – A warrior who wields bow and arrows.
 Ti Ben – A warrior who uses portable gunpowder-based artillery.
 Rim – A warrior who uses a sword-dagger combo and bombs.
 Po – A warrior who uses a kusarigama and shuriken.

Episodes

Season 1 (1992)

Season 2 (1993)

Video game

A video game based on the series was produced by Enix for the Super NES platform in 1995. The game features a final confrontation between King Arthur and Morgana, in the form of a giant dragon, providing a finale to the series where the Knights football team were able to return to their own time.

Merchandise
Mattel released a handful of 5" action figures and vehicles/accessories based on the show. Marvel Comics released a three-part comic book miniseries written by Mike Lackey in 1993.

Home releases
Maximum Entertainment released the complete series of King Arthur and the Knights of Justice on Region 2 DVD in the UK. In 2010, after several various partial VHS and DVD releases, Image Entertainment released the complete series as a boxed set in North America with all 26 episodes in a three-DVD set King Arthur and the Knights of Justice: The Complete Animated Series.

For some time during late 2000s, the whole series has been made available for free watching through Internet streaming at the Lycos' SyncTV service and on Kidlet. Between 2012 and 2014, it has been also available for instant streaming on Netflix. In 2016, Golden Films released it via Amazon.com. As of 2019, the series is available from the subscription service Watch It Kid!. The series is also available on tubi.

Reception 
The show has been ranked first on the lists of "The 10 Most Ridiculous Adaptations of Arthurian Legend" (2009) and the "8 Mostly Forgotten '90s Cartoons" (2011) by website Topless Robot, as well as "15 Most WTF Adaptations of King Arthur" by ScreenRant in 2017. Conversely, writer Mark McCray gave it a positive review "thanks to Chalopin's creative touches, which included a great premise, exceptional storytelling, and beautifully drawn animated characters."

See also
 Princess Gwenevere and the Jewel Riders

References

External links
 (BKN International)
 (Golden Films)

1990s American animated television series
1992 American television series debuts
1993 American television series endings
1993 comics debuts
1993 comics endings
English-language television shows
American children's animated action television series
American children's animated adventure television series
American children's animated fantasy television series
American time travel television series
Canadian children's animated action television series
Canadian children's animated adventure television series
Canadian children's animated fantasy television series
Canadian time travel television series
Television shows adapted into comics
Television shows adapted into video games
Television series based on Arthurian legend
Fantasy television characters
Fictional military organizations
Fictional sports teams
First-run syndicated television programs in the United States
Marvel Comics titles
Mattel
Television series created by Jean Chalopin
Works based on Merlin
1990s American time travel television series
1990s Canadian time travel television series